Luke Yates (born 6 March 1995) is an Australian professional rugby league footballer who plays as a  and  and as team captain for the Huddersfield Giants in the Betfred Super League.

He previously played for the Newcastle Knights in the NRL, and the London Broncos and the Salford Red Devils in the Super League.

Background
Yates was born in Newcastle, New South Wales, Australia.

He played his junior rugby league for the Western Suburbs Rosellas, before being signed by the Newcastle Knights.

Playing career

Early career
From 2013 to 2015, Yates played for the Newcastle Knights' NYC team. In May 2015, he re-signed with the Newcastle club on two-year contract until the end of 2017.

In July 2015, he played for the New South Wales under-20s team against the Queensland under-20s team.

In 2016, he graduated to Newcastle's Intrust Super Premiership NSW team.

Newcastle Knights
In round 1 of the 2017 NRL season, Yates made his NRL debut for Newcastle against the New Zealand Warriors.

Yates made a total of 19 appearances for Newcastle in his debut year as the club finished with the wooden spoon for a third consecutive year.

In September, he re-signed with Newcastle on a one- contract until the end of 2018. He finished the year with 19 appearances.

Yates only managed to play 6 NRL matches for the Newcastle club in 2018 before parting ways at the end of the season.

London Broncos
Ahead of the 2019 season, Yates joined the London Broncos in the Super League on a one-year contract.

He was second in the Top Tackler award at the Betfred Super League Awards evening on 6 October 2019, after completing 1211 tackles over the course of 28 games in the 2019 Super League season.

After being relegated from the Super League on points difference, he left the club at the end of his contract.

Salford Red Devils
Yates signed for Salford from the London Broncos in October 2019. During the 2020 season he signed a two-year contract extension, which would see him through to the end of the 2022 season.

On 17 October 2020, Yates played in the 2020 Challenge Cup Final defeat for Salford against Leeds at Wembley Stadium.

Huddersfield Giants
On 24 December 2020, it was announced that Yates would join the Huddersfield from the 2021 season. He joined Huddersfield for a significant transfer fee as his Salford contract still had two seasons left to run. He was made team captain for Huddersfield for the 2022 season

On 28 May 2022, Yates played for Huddersfield in their 2022 Challenge Cup Final loss to Wigan. and has become a firm favourite with the fans due to his hard working and tenacious play.

Representative
On 25 June 2021 he played for the Combined Nations All Stars in their 26-24 victory over England, staged at the Halliwell Jones Stadium, Warrington, as part of England’s 2021 Rugby League World Cup preparation.

References

External links

London Broncos profile
SL profile
Newcastle Knights profile

1995 births
Living people
Australian rugby league players
Australian expatriate sportspeople in England
Combined Nationalities rugby league team players
Huddersfield Giants players
London Broncos players
Newcastle Knights players
Rugby league locks
Rugby league props
Rugby league players from Newcastle, New South Wales
Salford Red Devils players
Western Suburbs Rosellas players